Bartholomaeus of Drahonice ( 1390–1443) was a Bohemian soldier, and author of a chronicle of the Hussite revolution.

References

1390s births
1443 deaths
Chroniclers
Year of birth uncertain
Date of death unknown